This is a list of years in Brunei.

21st century

20th century

 
Brunei